Andrew Hodgson (born 15 January 1994), also known by the online alias Reading Steiner, is a British professional Japanese-to-English translator often working with J-Novel Club and PQube Games. His output encompasses numerous forms of Japanese media, including light novels, manga, video games, and art books. Some of his most notable works include Steins;Gate, In Another World With My Smartphone, Sword Art Online: Alicization Lycoris, Infinite Dendrogram, and Rance X: Showdown.

Career

Hodgson participated in various fan translation projects for several years before, in 2011, joining a group that was working on localizing Steins;Gate. After the release of the fan translation patch, several members of the group, including Hodgson, were approached by JAST USA about an official release. Steins;Gate would become Hodgson's first officially credited work. 

In 2017, following his work on several additional video game projects, Hodgson approached J-Novel Club after learning that they had licensed the Occultic;Nine light novels, another entry in the Science Adventure franchise of which Steins;Gate is a part. Immediately after joining the company, he began work on In Another World With My Smartphone, and took over translation for Infinite Dendrogram shortly after. 

Hodgson worked briefly with the now-defunct Sol Press, translating the first volume of Harem Royale: When The Game Ends in 2018. After the company's forfeit and closure, he characterized its leadership as inexperienced and uncommunicative. In 2021, Hodgson announced he was beginning work on Rance X: Showdown.

In June 2022, Hodgson joined PQube full-time as their Localisation Coordinator, and became the Head of Localisation Operations in October.

Personal life

Hodgson has one younger brother and one younger sister.

Works

Light novels

Manga

Video games

Art books

References

Living people
Literary translators
21st-century British translators
Japanese–English translators
1994 births